Ali  politician (born 6 June 1996) is a Pakistani politician.

Early life and education
Nargis was born on 6 June 1996

She has a Bachelor of Education degree.

Political career
She was elected to the Provincial Assembly of Khyber Pakhtunkhwa as a candidate of Pakistan Tehreek-e-Insaf on a reserved seat for women in 2013 Pakistani general election.

In November 2013, she was made Parliamentary Secretary of Khyber Pakhtunkhwa Assembly for Relief, Rehabilitation and Settlement.

In May 2016, Ali joined a resolution to establish a Women's Caucus in the Provincial Assembly of Khyber Pakhtunkhwa. She also joined a resolution to declare 8 July as Charity Day in honour of Abdul Sattar Edhi.

In May 2018, Ali quit PTI and joined Pakistan Muslim League (Q).

References

Living people
1965 births